Errázuriz is a surname. Notable people with the surname include:

Blanca Errázuriz (1894–1940), Chilean socialite
Crescente Errázuriz (1839–1931), Chilean Roman Catholic friar and archbishop, professor, writer and historian
Eugenia Errázuriz (1860–1951), Chilean patron of the arts and a style leader 
Federico Errázuriz:
Federico Errázuriz Zañartu (1825–1877), president of Chile from 1871 to 1876
Federico Errázuriz Echaurren (1850–1901), president of Chile from 1896 to 1901
Francisco Errázuriz:
Francisco Javier Errázuriz Ossa, Chilean Catholic cardinal
Francisco Javier Errázuriz Larraín (1711–1767), Chilean merchant, farmer and politician
Francisco Javier Errázuriz Talavera, Chilean politician
Federico Errázuriz Zañartu (1825–1877), Chilean politician
Jaime Errázuriz (born 1923), Chilean alpine skier
José Antonio Errázuriz (1747–1821), Chilean Roman Catholic priest and politician
Juan Ignacio González Errázuriz (born 1956), Chilean Roman Catholic bishop 
León Errázuriz, Chilean filmmaker
María Errázuriz (1861–1922), First Lady of Chile
Maximiano Errázuriz (1832–1890), Chilean politician, industrialist and winemaker
Paz Errázuriz (born 1944), Chilean photographer
Rafael Errázuriz Urmeneta (1861–1923), Chilean politician and diplomat
Virginia Errázuriz (born 1941), Chilean painter, professor, printmaker and draftsperson

See also
Errázuriz Family